Rise of the Red Engineers : The Cultural Revolution and the Origins of China's New Class is authored by Joel Andreas, published in 2009 and published in Chinese in 2017.

Comments
 Dong Guoqiang: "It is not only very wise in discussing strategies, but is also innovative in research content."
 Zheng Xiaowei: "Rise of the Red Engineers is a powerful and lucid book in the fields of Chinese studies, sociology, and comparative politics."

References

2009 non-fiction books
Books about the Cultural Revolution
History books about China